Korbett Matthews (born 1972) is a documentary filmmaker and media educator based in Montreal, Quebec, Canada.

History
Matthews produces international works which elude categorization. He merges new forms of cinematic expression with traditional nonfiction approaches to move viewers into a new audio-visual realm.

Matthews's work has been awarded prizes by such festivals as the Images Festival, Docupolis, the Yorkton Short Film Festival, L’Alterniva Festival of Independent Cinema, the Amnesty International Film Festival and Hot Docs Canadian International Documentary Film Festival. He studied filmmaking at Concordia University’s Mel Hoppenheim School of Cinema and worked as a research associate and assistant director to the acclaimed documentary filmmaker Patricio Henriquez of Macumba International.

In 2003, he and fellow filmmaker Prem Sooriyakumar founded 7th Embassy (7E)
, an international filmtank devoted to the production of creative documentary media projects and development initiatives.

Films

His short films include:
the lyrical Haitian travelogue Lèzenvisib (2000)
Cambodian genocidal essay Devouring Buddha (2002), which was awarded Best Direction for Short to Mid-Length Documentary - Canadian Spectrum Program at Hot Docs

the feature documentary The Man Who Crossed The Sahara (2007)

As of 2008 he is beginning production of a documentary opera on India and the space race as well as beginning research on Farewell to Grozny, a documentary on the War in Chechnya. He currently works as a lecturer in media production at NHTV Breda University of Applied Sciences in the Netherlands.

References

See also

Canadian documentary film directors
Film directors from Montreal
1972 births
Living people